is a Japanese tokusatsu television drama, the 46th entry in Toei's long-running Super Sentai series and the third produced in the Reiwa era. The series is a semi-sequel to the previous entry, Kikai Sentai Zenkaiger, and premiered one week after its ending, joining Kamen Rider Revice and later, Kamen Rider Geats in the Super Hero Time lineup on TV Asahi on March 6, 2022. The series is loosely based on the Japanese folktale of Momotarō and the heroes fight monsters whose designs pay tribute to previous installments of the franchise.

Donbrothers began airing in South Korea as Power Rangers Don-Brothers. It was also the first series of the franchise to air officially in mainland China.

Plot

A man called Jin Momoi finds a baby inside a peach-shaped capsule whom he names Taro and raises. 21 years later, mysterious monsters called the Hitotsuki begin appearing when humans overcome with their inner desires are taken over by spirits infused with powers related to the Super Sentai of the past. Taro, and four other individuals selected by Jin; Shinichi Saruhara, a smart but eccentric young man, Haruka Kito, a high schooler manga artist, Tsubasa Inuzuka, a wanted fugitive, and Tsuyoshi Kijino, an ordinary salaryman; begin fighting the Hitotsuki and saving their hosts as the Donbrothers. They are later joined by Jiro Momotani, who was also found in a capsule as a baby and raised in a rural area, whose dream is to become a hero.

Also standing in their way are the Noto, elusive and ruthless individuals from a higher plane of existence who stop the Hitotsuki by sealing their hosts in another dimension, unlike the Donbrothers who use their powers to rescue them, Don Murasame, a mysterious warrior sent to fight them, and the Juto, strange and powerful creatures who are a threat to both humans and the Noto. The Donbrothers also count on the help of Kaito Goshikida, the owner of the coffee shop Donbura who transforms into Zenkaizer Black, and Jin, who is trapped in a virtual prison and occasionally offers them advice.

Episodes

Production
The trademark for the series was filed by Toei Company on October 18, 2021, while the cast and staff was officially announced on February 9, 2022, with Toshiki Inoue as main writer.

Don Momotaro, one of the main protagonists, first appeared in episode 42 of Zenkaiger as a mean of connecting both series. Two members of the team have inhuman proportions while transformed and are animated with computer graphics.

Impact of the COVID-19 pandemic

Haruka Kito's actress, Kohaku Shida, tested positive for COVID-19 on July 27, 2022, and recovered on August 9, 2022.

Films

New First Love Hero
 is a film released in Japanese theaters on July 22, 2022, double-billed with the film for Kamen Rider Revice. Actors Wakako Shimazaki, Nobuo Kyo, and Rika Kishida guest-starred as Reiko Saegusa, Director Kuroiwa, and an unnamed recipient respectively. The events of the film take place between episodes 20 and 21. This film is a tribute to Ninpuu Sentai Hurricaneger.

Special episodes
 is a three-episode web-exclusive short special released on the Bandai Official, TV Asahi Super Hero Time, and Toei Tokusatsu YouTube Official YouTube channels on March 1, 2022, containing a series of skits starring Don Momotaro and Kamen Rider Den-O. Toshihiko Seki reprised his voice role as Kamen Rider Den-O Sword Form.

 is a web-exclusive short special released on the Bandai Official, TV Asahi Super Hero Time, and Toei Tokusatsu YouTube Official YouTube channels on March 9, 2022. It shows Don Momotaro using his powers to Avatar Change into eleven past Red Sentai from Kaizoku Sentai Gokaiger to Mashin Sentai Kiramager and Zenkaizer from Kikai Sentai Zenkaiger. The shorts were released to promote the then-upcoming crossover film between Zenkaiger and Kiramager, which starred the featured past Red Sentai warriors as a tribute to Senpaigers.
 is a web-exclusive short special released on the Bandai Official, TV Asahi Super Hero Time, and Toei Tokusatsu YouTube Official YouTube channels on March 30, 2022.
 is a web-exclusive special released on Toei Tokusatsu Fan Club on December 25, 2022, featuring the Donbrothers teaming up with the Hurricanegers as part of the celebrations for the 20th anniversary of Ninpuu Sentai Hurricaneger with Shun Shioya, Nao Nagasawa, and Kōhei Yamamoto reprising their respective roles.
 is an upcoming web-exclusive special to be released on Toei Tokusatsu Fan Club in 2023, featuring the Donbrothers teaming up with the Abarangers as part of the celebrations for the 20th anniversary of Bakuryū Sentai Abaranger with Koichiro Nishi, Sho Tomita, and Michi Nishijima reprising their respective roles.

V-Cinema

Donbrothers vs. Zenkaiger
 is an upcoming V-Cinema release that features a crossover between Donbrothers and Kikai Sentai Zenkaiger. The V-Cinema is scheduled for a limited theatrical release on May 3, 2023, followed by its DVD and Blu-ray release on September 27, 2023. This film is divided into three acts of the story, focusing on the Donbrothers and Zenkaigers after their respective series, before uniting in the final act. The events of the V-Cinema take place a year after the final episode of the series.

Cast
: 
: 
: 
: 
: 
: 
: 
: 
: 
: 
: 
: 
: 
, : 
: 
: 
: 
: 
: 
: 
: 
: 
: 
Donbrothers Equipment Voice, Ninjark Sword Voice: 
Don Doragoku/Don Torabolt Equipment Voice:

Guest cast

: 
Dandy (6): 
: 
: 
: 
: 
Butler (22): 
: 
Oden cart owner (34, 37, 38, 49, 50): 
: 
Santa Claus (41): 
: 
: 
President of Jōdansha (50):

Songs
Opening theme

Lyrics: 
Composition & Arrangement: 
Artist: 
Ending theme

Lyrics: 
Composition & Arrangement: 
Artist: Win Morisaki

Reception
In an interview with series producer Shinichiro Shirakura, anime mecha designer Masami Ōbari praises the Donbrotherss mecha Don Onitaijin for its detailed proportions and its design, which he considered as an improvement over the past Sentai mechas. Shirakura added that the design of Don Onitaijin was decided as a sort of "revenge" when Zenkaiger'''s failed attempt to keep up with Bandai's toy release schedule. Ōbari had also hoped to participate in the production of Donbrothers in the future as a storyboard artist.

Notes

References

External links
 at TV Asahi 
 at Toei Company 
 at Super-Sentai.net 
 for Avataro Sentai Donbrothers the Movie: New First Love Hero 
 for Avataro Sentai Donbrothers vs. Zenkaiger'' 

Crossover tokusatsu television series
Super Sentai
2022 Japanese television series debuts
2023 Japanese television series endings
TV Asahi original programming
fr:Avataro Sentai Donbrothers